Il Cid della Spagna is a dramma per musica or opera in 2 acts by composer Giuseppe Farinelli. The work uses an Italian language libretto by Antonio Simeone Sografi that is based on Pierre Corneille's 1636 play Le Cid. The work premiered at La Fenice in Venice on 17 February 1802 in a double bill with Giuseppe Antonio Capuzzi's ballet Alessio di Wiarka.

Roles

References

Operas
1802 operas
Italian-language operas
Operas by Giuseppe Farinelli
Operas based on works by Pierre Corneille